The Tour de Québec is a road cycling stage race held on the Quebec city region. Created in September 2008 and now held annually in July. The event is for Pro-AM men, but other categories also compete; Juniors, masters and women.

Winners

Stage winners :
 Bruno Langlois (5)
 Charles Dionne (3)
 Guillaume Boivin (2)
 Thierry Laliberté (2)
 Pierre-Étienne Boivin
 Josh Dillon
 Aaron Fillion
 Zach Garland
 Michael Joanisse
 Derrick St. John
 Jordan Brochu
 Antoine Duchesne
 Hugo Houle
 Geoffroy Dusseault

External links
 Site officiel

Cycle races in Canada
Cycle racing in Quebec
Recurring sporting events established in 2008
2008 establishments in Quebec
Sports competitions in Quebec
Recurring sporting events disestablished in 2014
2014 disestablishments in Quebec